Hermann Berthelsen (born 2 March 1956) is a Greenlandic politician and affiliated with the Siumut party. As of July 2010, Berthelsen is the mayor of Sisimiut, a town  in central-western Greenland, and the administrative center of the Qeqqata municipality.

References

1956 births
Living people
Mayors of places in Greenland
People from Sisimiut
Siumut politicians
Badminton executives and administrators